José Vinicio Adames Piñero (March 1, 1927 – September 3, 1976) was a Venezuelan musician, and director of choral groups. He performed as a member of popular group Adames Trio with his sisters Yolanda and Shirley. He led a number of choral groups, including the UCV University Choir, the Chamber Orchestra of the Central University of Venezuela, the Chamber Orchestra of the University of Carabobo, the Panama Symphony Orchestra, the Metropolitan Chamber Orchestra of Caracas, the Shell Choir, the Choral of the Social Security, the Metropolitan Choral Group and the Central Bank of Venezuela Choral. He also wrote original choral pieces and arranged folk music. After his 1976 death in an airplane accident in the Azores Islands, he was honored in Caracas with a park in his name.

See also
Venezuelan music
Central University of Venezuela

References

1927 births
1976 deaths
Central University of Venezuela alumni
Academic staff of the Central University of Venezuela
Oakland University alumni
People from Barquisimeto
Venezuelan composers
Male composers
Victims of aviation accidents or incidents in Portugal
20th-century composers
20th-century male musicians